Dies non  is a part of the Latin phrase literally meaning "a day when courts do not sit or carry on business". Dies non juridicum is the full Latin phrase literally meaning "Day without judiciary.

The  expression dies non (juridicus) was used for defining a day which is not a (court) day or a day on which no legal business is carried on. Literally, dies non (juridicus) is "a not juridical day". Dictionary.com estimates that the word might have originated in 1600–10.

Doctrine of "no-work-no-pay" 

The doctrine of "no-work-no-pay" is a fundamental axiom in industrial relations. The philosophy are very simple. When a person
is employed, it is expected that the work assigned will be carried out. When this work is not done, the employee is not
eligible for payment of any salary.

Even when a general strike or countrywide ban disrupts public transport systems, and consequently employees are unable to reach their workplaces, the same principle prevails. Even die-hard trade union leaders respect this principle of equity and natural justice. "No work, no pay" lays a strong foundation to industrial peace and harmony in the long run.

See also 
 dies non juridicum

Notes

External links 
 http://delhicourts.nic.in/Dec07/EX.%20CONST.%20SURESH%20KUMAR%20VS.%20COMMISSIONER%20OF%20POLICE.pdf
 The Hindu : New Delhi News : No work no pay: High Court
 Strike still on: AI declares no work, no pay - Rediff.com Business

Human resource management
Legal terminology
Labor relations